Brian Donald Moorman (born February 5, 1976) is an American former football punter in the National Football League (NFL). He played college football for Pittsburg State University, and was signed by the Seattle Seahawks as an undrafted free agent in 1999 and played for the Buffalo Bills from 2001 to 2012, to which he returned after a one-year absence in 2013.  He also played for the Dallas Cowboys in 2012.  Moorman is a two-time Pro Bowl selection and was voted into the Buffalo Bills' 50th Anniversary Team. He is the founder of the P.U.N.T. Foundation which supports children in Western New York who face life-threatening illnesses.

Early years 
At Sedgwick High School in Sedgwick, Kansas, Moorman lettered in football, track, and basketball.  In track, he was a three-time state hurdle champion and received all-state honors in Football and Baseball.

College career 
Moorman became the first four-time All-American football player in Pittsburg State University history. He earned first-team NCAA Division II All-America honors as a punter in each of his final two collegiate seasons (1997–98) after earning honorable mention All-America honors his first two years (1995–96). Moorman still holds the school's career punting record (43.97 ypp) and he was named to PSU's prestigious 100th Anniversary Football Team in 2003.

Track and field
Moorman earned All-America honors on 10 occasions, including three straight NCAA Division II national championships in the 400 meter hurdles (1997–99). He also claimed eight conference individual event titles. Moorman also still holds the Pittsburg State University school record in the 110 meter hurdles (13.81) and ranks second all-time at PSU in the 400m hurdles (49.77).

Personal bests

Professional career

Buffalo Bills 

Moorman signed with the Buffalo Bills as a free agent during the summer of 2001.
Moorman was named to the starting squad of the 2006 Pro Bowl for the second consecutive year. Moorman also made the 2007 Pro Bowl in which during the game he was most remembered for getting hit hard by the late Washington Redskins safety, Sean Taylor, a play which is considered one of Taylor's most memorable plays before his tragic death.
On July 2, 2007, the Buffalo Bills rewarded Moorman with a 10 million dollar contract extension (through 2012), making him the second-highest paid punter in the league, behind Shane Lechler.
In a 2008 34-10 opening day victory over the Seattle Seahawks, Moorman lined up to hold for what looked like a routine field goal attempt by placekicker Rian Lindell but instead took the ball and heaved a 19-yard touchdown strike to defensive end Ryan Denney.
Moorman had a career average of 46.6 yards per punt. In 2009, he also had a new career high in total yards punting with 4192 yards. On September 25, 2012, the Bills released Moorman soon after the third regular season game. He was replaced by Shawn Powell.

Dallas Cowboys 
On September 26, 2012, Moorman signed with the Dallas Cowboys to replace an injured Chris Jones. He played 12 games with the Cowboys for a total of 15 games played in the 2012 regular season.

Pittsburgh Steelers
Moorman signed with the Pittsburgh Steelers on April 30, 2013. He was waived during the preseason.

Return to the Buffalo Bills 
Moorman re-signed with the Buffalo Bills on October 6, 2013, after the release of Shawn Powell.  He was released August 29, 2014.

Retirement 
Following his second release from the Bills, he announced his retirement through a letter to the city of Buffalo.  Despite 14 years of professional football, Moorman never played a single postseason game, making him the only member of the NFL's 2000 All-Decade team to never play in a playoff game.

Awards

References

External links 

 Buffalo Bills bio
 Brian Moorman's P.U.N.T. Foundation

1976 births
Living people
People from Sedgwick, Kansas
Players of American football from Wichita, Kansas
American football punters
Pittsburg State Gorillas football players
Berlin Thunder players
Seattle Seahawks players
Buffalo Bills players
Dallas Cowboys players
Pittsburgh Steelers players
American Conference Pro Bowl players